Mark Lester (born Mark A. Letzer; 11 July 1958) is an English former child actor, osteopath, and acupuncturist who starred in a number of British and European films in the 1960s and 1970s. In 1968 he played the title role in the film Oliver!, a musical version of the Charles Dickens' novel Oliver Twist. Lester also made several appearances in a number of British television series. In 1977, after appearing in the all-star international action adventure film The Prince and the Pauper, he retired from acting. In the 1980s, he trained as an osteopath specialising in sport injuries.

Early life
Mark Lester was born in the city of Oxford to actress Rita Keene Lester and actor and producer Michael Lester (originally Michael Boris Letzer). His father is Jewish and his mother Anglican.  Lester was educated at three independent schools: at Corona Theatre School in Ravenscourt Park in West London, followed by Tower House School, a boys' preparatory school near Richmond Park (also in West London), and at Halliford School in Shepperton in Surrey.

Acting career

Early performances
Lester initially had small roles in several British television series, including The Human Jungle and Danger Man. In 1964, at the age of six, Lester was cast in Robert Dhéry's film Allez France! (1964) (English title The Counterfeit Constable) with Diana Dors. 

He also appeared in Spaceflight IC-1: An Adventure in Space (1965), played a small part as the second schoolboy in Fahrenheit 451 (1966) and had a larger role in Our Mother's House (1967).

Oliver! and child stardom
In 1967, at the age of eight, Lester was cast in the title role in the film version of Lionel Bart's musical Oliver!.  The multiple Academy Award-winning adaptation of Charles Dickens' novel co-starred Jack Wild, Ron Moody, Harry Secombe, Shani Wallis and Oliver Reed and was directed by Carol Reed. Since Lester could not sing, his singing was dubbed by Kathe Green, daughter of the film's music arranger Johnny Green. 

Lester received critical acclaim for his portrayal of a dysfunctional and withdrawn only child in Run Wild, Run Free (1969), starring opposite John Mills, released by Columbia who financed Oliver!. He played a disturbed child in the first regular episode of Then Came Bronson ("The Runner") and also guest starred on The Ghost & Mrs. Muir. Columbia wanted to sign him to a long term contract but Lester's parents refused.

Lester had leading roles in Eyewitness (1970), a British thriller with Susan George shot on Malta; The Boy Who Stole the Elephant (1970), a TV movie for Disney; and the horror film Whoever Slew Auntie Roo? (1971), with Shelley Winters.

He was reunited with Wild in Melody (1971), which depicted schoolchildren in love, based on a script by Alan Parker. Tracy Hyde played the role of Melody in the film, which used music from the Bee Gees and Crosby, Stills, Nash & Young.

Lester starred in a film version of Black Beauty (1971). He was announced for a version of Treasure Island but it was never made. After this period, his acting roles in the UK would begin to wane.  This coincided with a decline in the British film industry.

European films
Lester remained in demand for films outside England: What the Peeper Saw (1972) with Britt Ekland; Senza ragione (1973), in Italy with Franco Nero; Little Adventurer (1973), a Japanese film; Scalawag (1973), a pirate film with Kirk Douglas shot in Yugoslavia; and the costume drama La Prima volta sull'erba (English title The First Time on the Grass, 1974), which was nominated for the Golden Bear prize at the 25th Berlin International Film Festival.

Lester ended his film career playing the dual role as Edward VI of England and Tom Canty in the all-star film The Prince and the Pauper (US title: Crossed Swords, 1977) starring Raquel Welch, Charlton Heston, Rex Harrison, George C. Scott, and Oliver Reed, who had played Bill Sikes in Oliver!. 

After this he said "I bought myself a Ferrari and set off through Europe for 18 months."

Later life
At the age of 18, Lester had access to some of his earnings from his films. He bought a Ferrari and a house in Belgravia and went to parties, nightclubs and restaurants, often paying for friends, and taking drugs. In his twenties, he became a karate black belt; through this he grew interested in sports injuries, and from there osteopathy. At the age of 28, he took his A-Levels, passing Chemistry and Biology. He became an osteopath, studying at the British School of Osteopathy, and in 1993, Lester opened the Carlton Clinic, an acupuncture clinic in Cheltenham.

He is a patron of the theatre charity The Music Hall Guild of Great Britain and America.

Personal life
Lester has four children with his first wife, Jane, whom he married in January 1993 and divorced in 2005. In 2006 he married his second wife, Lisa, a psychiatric nurse.  They divorced in 2009. Since 2018, he has been in a relationship with Brooke Hamilton, a former Miss Dallas, USA. 

Lester was a close friend of Michael Jackson and is godfather to Jackson's three children, while Jackson was godfather to Lester's four children, for which they did a ceremony in Las Vegas in 2003. In 2019, Lester appears in the documentary, Michael Jackson: Chase the Truth, in which he doubts allegations of sexual misconduct that had been made against Jackson by Wade Robson and James Safechuck.

Filmography

Film

Television

References

Bibliography
 Holmstrom, John. The Moving Picture Boy: An International Encyclopaedia from 1895 to 1995. Norwich, Michael Russell, 1996, pp. 323–324.
 Dye, David. Child and Youth Actors: Filmography of Their Entire Careers, 1914-1985. Jefferson, NC: McFarland & Co., 1988, pp. 130–131.

External links 

1958 births
Living people
20th-century English male actors
English male child actors
English male film actors
English male television actors
Male actors from Oxfordshire
Osteopaths
People educated at Tower House School
actors from Oxford